"Something's Always Wrong" is a single by alternative rock band Toad the Wet Sprocket. The song is included on their 1994 album Dulcinea. "Something's Always Wrong" was co-written by Glen Phillips and Todd Nichols. Although not as popular as "Fall Down", "Something's Always Wrong" became a hit in the United States and Canada and helped propel Dulcinea to platinum status.

Background

Singer Glen Phillips said,

Chart performance
"Something's Always Wrong" was a hit, although not to the extent of "Fall Down." The single peaked at number nine on the US Billboard Modern Rock Tracks chart. The single also peaked at number 41 on the Billboard Hot 100 and number 15 on the Canadian RPM Top Singles chart. The single helped to make Dulcinea Toad the Wet Sprocket's first top-forty album on the Billboard 200.

Track listing
"Something's Always Wrong"
"Don't Go Away (Live)"
"Corporal Brown (Live)"

Charts

In popular culture
The song was featured in the films Fear and Tuesdays with Morrie and in the TV series Scrubs and Cold Case.

References

1990s ballads
1994 singles
1994 songs
Columbia Records singles
Protest songs
Songs written by Glen Phillips (singer)
Songs written by Todd Nichols (musician)
Toad the Wet Sprocket songs
Alternative rock ballads